Aerolíneas Argentinas Flight 644 was a scheduled flight operated by the Douglas DC-6, registration LV-ADW, on 19 July 1961 which was due to operate a domestic scheduled passenger service between Ministro Pistarini International Airport and General Enrique Mosconi International Airport, but crashed  west of Pardo, Buenos Aires, Argentina, half an hour after takeoff, owing to severe turbulence during climb out. This aircraft had been originally named 'Presidente Peron' but by 1956-57 had been renamed 'General San Martin'. Some reports stated the aircraft was struck by lightning.

According to the investigation, the plane disintegrated en route after the rupture of one its wings following excessive loads in a zone of turbulence. Both the pilot and the company's flight dispatcher contributed to the disaster by misevaluating the weather forecast and choosing an inappropriate flight altitude. All 67 occupants of the aircraft – 7 crew and 60 passengers – were killed in the accident, which remains the deadliest one the company experienced all through its history.

As of 2023, Flight 644 remains the deadliest aviation disaster in Argentine history.

See also
Aerolíneas Argentinas accidents and incidents
List of accidents and incidents involving commercial aircraft

References

External links
 Final report  (Archive) – Junta de Investigaciones de Accidentes de Aviación Civil

Aviation accidents and incidents in Argentina
Aerolíneas Argentinas accidents and incidents
Accidents and incidents involving the Douglas DC-6
Airliner accidents and incidents caused by weather
Airliner accidents and incidents caused by pilot error
Airliner accidents and incidents caused by in-flight structural failure
Aviation accidents and incidents in 1961
1961 meteorology
July 1961 events in South America